Reflexiones is the eighth (8th) studio album by Puerto Rican singer Yolandita Monge. It was released in 1976 on LP, 8-Track and Cassette format and contains the radio hits Páginas Del Alma and Es La Lluvia Que Cayendo Va.

The album is available as a digital download at iTunes and Amazon, as well as several hits songs also appear in various compilations of the singer available on such media platforms.  Coco Records/Charly re-released the album in November 2020 as a digital download, also available at iTunes and Amazon. The album also got a physical CD release in June 2022.

Track listing

Credits and personnel
Vocals: Yolandita Monge
Producer: Enrique Méndez
Arrangements & Recording Director: Raúl Parentella
Mastering: José Rodríguez
Recorded: Buenos Aires, Argentina, May 1976
Art Direction & Design: Hal. Wilson
Photography: Cándido Ortiz

Notes
Track listing and credits from album cover.
Re-released digitally by Musical Productions on October 25, 2016.
Re-released digitally by Coco Records/Charly on November, 2020.
Re-released on CD by Coco Records on June, 2022.

References

Yolandita Monge albums
1976 albums